Daniel Alexander Castano (born September 17, 1994) is an American professional baseball pitcher in the Miami Marlins organization. He made his MLB debut in 2020.

Amateur career
Castano attended Lake Travis High School in Austin, Texas. During his senior year, he posted a 6–3 record with a 1.03 ERA over  innings over 11 appearances. He was also named District MVP along with Team MVP. After graduating from Lake Travis, Castano enrolled at Baylor University where he played three years of college baseball for the Baylor Bears. In 2015, he played collegiate summer baseball with the Chatham Anglers of the Cape Cod Baseball League. In 2016, his junior year, he pitched to a 4–5 record with a 4.64 ERA in 14 games started for Baylor.

Professional career

St. Louis Cardinals
After the season, the St. Louis Cardinals selected Castano in the 19th round of the 2016 Major League Baseball draft. He signed with St. Louis and was assigned to the Johnson City Cardinals.

Castano spent all of 2016, his first professional season, with Johnson City, posting a 6.19 ERA along with a 2–5 record in 12 games (11 starts). In 2017, he played for the State College Spikes, where he greatly improved, pitching to a 9–3 record and a 2.57 ERA over 14 starts, earning New York-Penn League All-Star honors.

Miami Marlins
On December 13, 2017, the Cardinals traded Castano, Sandy Alcántara, Magneuris Sierra and Zac Gallen to the Miami Marlins in exchange for outfielder Marcell Ozuna. He began the 2018 season with the Jupiter Hammerheads, and also spent time with the Gulf Coast Marlins and the Greensboro Grasshoppers during the year. Over 24 games (23 starts) between the three teams, he went 9–12 with a 3.93 ERA. He returned to Jupiter to begin 2019 and was promoted to the Jacksonville Jumbo Shrimp in May. Over thirty games (11 starts) between the two clubs, Castano pitched to a 7–4 record with a 3.48 ERA, striking out 104 batters over 119 innings.

On August 8, 2020, Castano made his MLB debut against the New York Mets, giving up 4 earned runs over 4.1 innings. He finished his rookie season with a 1–2 record and 3.03 ERA in 7 appearances.

On July 9, 2021, Castano was placed on the 60-day injured list with a left shoulder impingement. On the year, he only made 5 appearances (4 starts), posting an 0–2 record and 4.87 ERA with 13 strikeouts in 20.1 innings pitched.

In 2022, Castano appeared in 10 games for Miami (7 starts), and pitched to a 1–3 record and 4.04 ERA with 20 strikeouts in 35.1 innings of work.

On January 19, 2023, Castano was designated for assignment by the Marlins after the signing of Johnny Cueto was made official. On January 26, Castano cleared waivers and was sent outright to the Triple-A Jacksonville Jumbo Shrimp.

Personal life
Castano is a Christian. Castano is married to Brooke Castano. They have two sons together.

References

External links

1994 births
Living people
Baseball players from Orlando, Florida
Baylor Bears baseball players
Chatham Anglers players
Greensboro Grasshoppers players
Gulf Coast Marlins players
Jacksonville Jumbo Shrimp players
Johnson City Cardinals players
Jupiter Hammerheads players
Major League Baseball pitchers
Miami Marlins players
State College Spikes players